Central State Prison is located in unincorporated Bibb County, Georgia. The facility is operated by the Georgia Department of Corrections.

The facility houses adult male felons, the capacity is 1153. It was constructed in 1978 and opened in 1978. It is a Medium Security Prison.

References

Prisons in Georgia (U.S. state)
Buildings and structures in Bibb County, Georgia
1978 establishments in Georgia (U.S. state)